Sambhunath Banerjee was a Bengali Indian scholar of law, and a judge of the Calcutta High Court, who served as the Vice Chancellor of the University of Calcutta.

He was educated at the renowned Scottish Church College in Calcutta, and at the University of Calcutta.

He would serve as the Vice Chancellor of the University of Calcutta from 11 May 1950 – 11 April 1954.

He was awarded an honorary Doctor of Law by the University of Calcutta on 26 December 1952.

References

20th-century Indian judges
Judges of the Calcutta High Court
Scottish Church College alumni
University of Calcutta alumni
Academic staff of the University of Calcutta
Vice Chancellors of the University of Calcutta
People from Kolkata